Facchini Group is an Italian manufacturing company which manufactures and sells worldwide machinery and equipment for the production of various types of fresh and dry pasta (such as ravioli, tortellini and tortelloni), and for the thermal treatment of food products. The company was founded in 1959 by Spartaco Facchini.

The company originally produced high-precision equipment for the food industry. With the Spartacos two sons Roberto and Mauro  involved in the family business, the staff was expanded and the internal structure modified. The two brothers began selling Facchini Group's production directly to large companies in the food production field, nationally and internationally.

In 2006 the company moved to a new facility in Cormano (in the Province of Milan area) to increase capacity of production of single machines. A year later, another facility was created in San Pietro in Gu (in the Province of Padua area) to manufacture complete pasta production lines.

See also 

List of Italian companies

References
Official website

Industrial machine manufacturers
Manufacturing companies of Italy
Companies based in Lombardy
Manufacturing companies established in 1959
Italian companies established in 1959
Italian brands